Bart J.  Carroll (December 29, 1893 – April 1, 1967) was an American football player and coach. He played  college football at Colgate University from 1914 to 1917 and professionally with the Rochester Jeffersons of the American Professional Football Association (APFA)—now known as the National Football League (NFL)—for one season, in 1920. Carroll served as the head football coach at St. Lawrence University from 1919 to 1920 and Hamilton College from 1922 to 1926.  He was also the head basketball coach at Hamilton for one season, in 1922–23, tallying a mark of 7–7.

References

External links
 

1893 births
1967 deaths
American football tackles
American men's basketball coaches
Colgate Raiders football coaches
Colgate Raiders football players
Hamilton Continentals football coaches
Hamilton Continentals men's basketball coaches
Rochester Jeffersons players
St. Lawrence Saints football coaches
St. Lawrence Saints men's basketball coaches
People from Massena, New York
Coaches of American football from New York (state)
Players of American football from New York (state)
Basketball coaches from New York (state)